Felix is a given name that stems from Latin   (genitive  ) and means "happy" or "lucky". Its other form is Felicity.

In German, Dutch, Czech, Slovenian, Romanian and Scandinavian languages the form "Felix" is the same as English. In French, Hungarian, Slovak, Portuguese and Spanish it is written with an acute accent, "Félix”. The Italian form of the name is "Felice", and its Polish and Serbian form is "Feliks".

View a list of notable people with the name "Felix" below.

Romans
 Antonius Felix, procurator of Judaea
 A part of many Roman emperors' titles, starting with Commodus
 Flavius Felix (died 430), Roman consul
 Felix (son of Entoria), son of Saturn and Entoria and brother of Janus in Roman mythology
 Lucius Cornelius Sulla Felix (138–78 BC), Roman dictator commonly known as Sulla

Late Antiquity and Middle Ages

Saints
"Saint Felix" may refer to:
 Felix of Heraclea, martyred with Januarius
 Felix and Constantia (d. 68), martyrs
 Felix, Fortunatus, and Achilleus (d. c. 212), martyrs
 Felix of Nola (d. c. 255)
 Felix and Regula (d. 286), martyrs
 Felix of Thibiuca (d. 303), bishop of Thibiuca, and patron of Venosa, martyred with Audactus, Fortunatus, Januarius, and Septimus
 Felix and Adauctus (d. c. 303), martyrs
 Felix and Nabor (d. c. 303), martyrs
 Felix of Girona (d. 304), martyr
 Felix of Como (d. c. 390)
 Felix of Nîmes (4th century)
 Felix (d. c. 310), martyred at Furci with Justin of Siponto
 Felix of Hadrumetum (d. c. 434) North African Catholic bishop
 Felix of Cornwall (5th or 6th century)
 Felix of Nantes (died 584), bishop of Nantes
 Felix of Burgundy (7th century), who introduced Christianity to the East Anglians
 Felix (d. 852), one of the Martyrs of Córdoba with Aurelius and Natalia
 Felix the Hermit (9th century)
 Felix of Rhuys (d. 1038)
 Felix of Valois (d. 1212)
 Felix, martyred with Anesius

Popes
 Pope Felix I (269–274)
 Antipope Felix II (356–365)
 Pope Felix III (483–492)
 Pope Felix IV (526–530)
 Antipope Felix V, earlier Amadeus VIII of Savoy (1439–1449)

Bishops and priests
 Felix (bishop of Urgell) (died 818), Christian bishop and theologian
 Felix of Byzantium (fl. early 2nd century), bishop of Byzantium
 Felix of Ravenna, archbishop in 709-724
 Felix, Frankish clerk of King Æthelwulf, King of Wessex (fl. 9th century)
 Felix, author of a Life of Saint Guthlac

Early modern period (1500–1799)
 Felix of Cantalice (died 1587)
 Felix of Nicosia (died 1787)

Modern times (1800–present)

Aliases
 Felix (musician), the alias of British DJ and producer Francis Wright
 Felix da Housecat, American House music DJ and record producer
 The pseudonym of Nicholas Wanostrocht, 19th-century English cricketer
 The codename of Cold War spy Dieter Gerhardt
 The pen name of Tom Horan, Australian Test cricketer and cricket journalist

Given name
 Felix Adler (screenwriter) (1884–1963), American screenwriter
 Felix Adler (professor) (1851–1933), German-American lecturer and founder of the Ethical movement
 Felix Agnus (1839–1925), American military officer and newspaper editor
 Felix Andries Vening Meinesz (1887–1966), Dutch geophysicist and geodesist
 Felix Arndt (1889–1918), American pianist and popular-music composer
 Félix Auger-Aliassime, Canadian tennis player
 Felix Batista, Cuban-American anti-kidnapping expert
 Felix Baumgartner, Austrian skydiver who set the world record for the highest skydive at 127,000 feet (39 km)
 Felix Behrend (1911–1962), German and Australian mathematician
 Felix Bloch (1905–1983), Swiss-American physicist and Nobel laureate
 Felix Brych, German football referee 
 Felix Bwalya (1970–1997), Zambian boxer
 Félix Caballero, Dominican priest
 Felix Calonder (1863–1952), Swiss politician
 Felix Cavaliere, American musician and singer-songwriter
 Félix Chopin (1813–1892), French bronze designer
 Felix Chung (born 1963), Hong Kong politician 
 Felix Dexter (1961–2013), British comedian
 Felix Dias Bandaranaike (1930-1985), Sri Lankan lawyer and politician
 Felix Reginald Dias Bandaranaike I (1861-1947), Ceylonese (Sri Lankan) judge and lawyer
 Felix Reginald Dias Bandaranaike II (1891-1951), Ceylonese (Sri Lankan) judge and lawyer
 Felix Maria Diogg (1762–1834), Swiss painter
 Felix Dodds, British author, futurist and artist
 Felix Dzerzhinsky (1877–1926), Bolshevik revolutionary and official
 Felix Ehrlich (1877–1942), German chemist and biochemist
 Félix Faure (1841–1899), President of France from 1895 until 1899
 Félix Fénéon (1861–1944), French anarchist and art critic
 Félix Fermín, Dominican former professional baseball shortstop
 Félix Omar Fernández, Puerto Rican track and field athlete
 Felix Frankfurter (1882–1965), Austrian-American jurist
 Felix Gelt, Canadian association football player 
 Felix N. Gerson (1862–1945), American newspaper editor 
 Félix González-Torres (1957–1996), Cuban-American artist
 Félix Guattari (1930–1992), French psychoanalyst, political philosopher, semiotician, social activist, and screenwriter
 Felix Hamrin (1875–1937), Swedish politician
 Felix Hanemann, American singer and musician
 Felix Hausdorff (1868–1942), German mathematician
 Félix Hernández, Venezuelan baseball pitcher
 Félix José Hernández, Venezuelan football midfielder
 Felix Hoffmann (1868–1946), German chemist and inventor of Aspirin
 Felix Hoffmann (basketball), German basketball player
 Félix Houphouët-Boigny (1905–1993), first president of Ivory Coast
 Felix Jaehn, German DJ and music producer
 Felix Jones, American football player
 Felix Jones (rugby union), Irish rugby union player
 Felix Kaspar (1915–2003), Austrian figure skater
 Felix Klein (1849–1925), German mathematician
 Felix Kjellberg, Swedish YouTube personality and video gamer, better known as PewDiePie
 Felix Kroos, German football player
 Felix Landau (1910–1983), Austrian SS Hauptscharführer, member of an Einsatzkommando during World War II
 Felix Latzke, Austrian football former player and manager 
 Félix Leclerc (1914–1988), Québécois singer-songwriter, poet, writer, actor and political activist
 Félix Lengyel, Canadian Twitch streamer
 Felix A. Levy, American rabbi
 Felix von Luckner (1881–1966), German nobleman and navy officer
 Felix Luk (born 1994), Hong Kong professional footballer
 Felix Magath, German football manager and former player
 Félix Malloum (1932–2009), Chadian military officer and politician
 Felix Manalo (1886–1963), Filipino founder and first leader of religious movement Iglesia ni Cristo
 Félix Mantilla (baseball), Puerto Rican former professional baseball utility player
 Félix Mantilla Botella, Spanish professional tennis player
 Félix Mathé (1834–1911), French politician
 Felix J. McCool (1912–1972), American Marine held as prisoner of war in both World War II and Korean War
 Felix Mendelssohn (1809–1847), German composer
 Felix Michel Melki (born 1994), Swedish-Lebanese footballer
 Félix Miélli Venerando (1927–2012), Brazilian football player
 Felix Morley (1894–1982), American journalist and college administrator
 Felix Neureuther, German alpine skier
 Felix A. Obuah, Nigerian business magnate, politician and philanthropist
 Félix W. Ortiz, American politician
 Felix Pappalardi (1939–1983), American musician and producer
 Felix Perera, Sri Lankan politician
 Felix Pipes (1887–1983), Austrian tennis player
 Félix Porteiro, Spanish racecar driver
 Félix Potvin, Canadian ice hockey goaltender
 Felix Reda, German researcher and politician
 Felix Riebl, Australian singer-songwriter
 Félix Rodríguez (baseball), Dominican former Major League Baseball relief pitcher
 Félix Rodríguez (soldier), Cuban-American soldier and CIA intelligence operative
 Félix Rodríguez de la Fuente, (1928–1980) Spanish naturalist and broadcaster
 Felix Rosenqvist, Swedish professional racing driver
 Felix Salmon, British financial journalist
 Felix Sater (born 1966), Russian-American mobster
 Felix Schütz, German ice hockey player
 Felix Siauw (born 1984), Chinese-Indonesian Islamic ustad, preacher, author and da'i
 Felix Silla, Italian actor
 Felix Standaert, Belgian diplomat
 Felix Steiner, German Waffen-SS commander, most notable for the participation in the Battle of Berlin
 Félix Stevens, Cuban sprinter
 Félix Torres (baseball), Puerto Rican baseball player
 Félix Trinidad, Puerto Rican boxer
 Felix Unger, Austrian heart surgeon
 Félix Varela (1788–1853), Cuban Catholic priest and independence leader
 Felix Wankel (1902–1988), German mechanical engineer and inventor of the Wankel engine
 Felix Weingartner (1863–1942), Austrian conductor, composer and pianist
 Felix D. Williamson (1921–1947), American pilot and United States Army Air Forces major
 Felix Yusupov (1887–1967), Russian aristocrat, famous for participating in the assassination of Grigory Rasputin
 Archduke Felix of Austria, Archduke of Austria, Prince Royal of Hungary and Bohemia
 Count Felix of Monpezat, member of the Danish royal family
 José Félix Uriburu, Argentinian Lieutenant
 León Félix Batista, Dominican poet
 Prince Felix of Bourbon-Parma (1893–1970), son of the deposed Robert I, Duke of Parma
 Prince Félix of Luxembourg, son of Grand Duke Henri of Luxembourg and Prince of Nassau
 Prince Felix of Schwarzenberg (1800–1852), Austrian statesman and part of Europe's highest nobility

Surname
 Allyson Felix (born 1985), American track and field athlete
 António Félix da Costa (born 1991), Portuguese racing driver
 João Félix (born 1999), Portuguese footballer
 Julie Felix, (1938–2020) American folk singer
 Julien Félix (fl. 1911), French aviator
 Margaret Elisabeth Felix (born 1937), Indian educator
 Miguel Ángel Félix Gallardo (born 1946), Mexican drug lord who formed the Guadalajara Cartel

Fictional characters
 Felix the Cat, a cartoon character
 Felix, in the 2009 American comedy film The Hangover
Felix, in the video game Scarface: The World Is Yours
 Felix, from the video game series SSX
 Felix, a member of the Volturi Guard in the Twilight series
 Felix, an Iberian lynx in the animated film Missing Lynx
 Felix, the protagonist of the novel Armor by John Steakley
 Felix, the title character from a series of Micro Power video games such as Felix in the Factory
 Felix, a 'lost boy' from the television show Once Upon a Time (TV series)
 Felix, a holo-programmer in Star Trek: Deep Space Nine
Felix, also known as Experiment 010, an alien experiment from Disney's Lilo & Stitch franchise
Felix, the main protagonist in Golden Sun: The Lost Age and supporting antagonist in Golden Sun, both of the Golden Sun video game series
 Felix Argyle, from the anime/light novel series Re:Zero − Starting Life in Another World
 Felix Bassenak, "Uncle Felix", character played by S. Z. "Cuddles" Sakall in the 1945 film Christmas in Connecticut
 Felix Boulevardez, in the television series, The Proud Family
 Felix Dawkins, a primary character portrayed by Jordan Gavaris in the BBC America/Space TV series Orphan Black
 Felix DeZouza, from the movie Formula 51
 Felix Ferne, from the Australian television show Nowhere Boys
 Felix Fischoeder, in the television series Bob's Burgers
Felix Hugo Fraldarius, a playable character in the video game Fire Emblem: Three Houses
 Felix Gaeta, in the re-imagined Battlestar Galactica TV series
 Felix Gunn, a minor character in the book series Children of the Red King
 Felix Harrowgate, the protagonist of the Doctrine of Labyrinths series of books
 Felix Holt, the title character in George Eliot's novel Felix Holt, the Radical
 Felix Jaeger, in the Gotrek and Felix series of books
 Felix Krull, the protagonist of Thomas Mann's novel Confessions of Felix Krull
Felix de Lacey, minor character in Mary Shelley's novel Frankenstein
 Felix Leiter, from the James Bond books and movies
 Felix Lodd, in The Edge Chronicles
Felix Philips, a minor character in the Kane Chronicles (book series)
 Felix Phillips, primary character in Margaret Atwood's novel Hag-Seed
 Felix Renton, in Disney's Kim Possible
Felix Richter, from Dead by Daylight
 Felix Sanders, the protagonist of The Divide trilogy book series
 Felix Stewart, in the BBC soap opera EastEnders
 Felix Taggaro, recurring character in the television series One Tree Hill'''
 Félix Tholomyes, minor character in Les Misérables and father of Cosette
 Felix Ungar, in the stage play, movie adaptation and television series The Odd Couple Félix Fathom, Adrien Agreste's cousin from the French animated television series Miraculous LadybugFix-It Felix Jr., from Disney's Wreck-It RalphFélix, from Disney’s Encanto''

See also
Felicia
Feliksas

References

Ancient Roman cognomina
Danish masculine given names
Dutch masculine given names
English masculine given names
French masculine given names
German masculine given names
Icelandic masculine given names
Irish masculine given names
Masculine given names
Norwegian masculine given names
Portuguese masculine given names
Spanish masculine given names
Swedish masculine given names